Esit-Eket is a town and Local Government Area of Akwa Ibom State, southern Nigeria.

References

Local Government Areas in Akwa Ibom State
Towns in Akwa Ibom State